Madison is the second studio by American band Sloppy Jane. It was released on November 5, 2021 by Saddest Factory and Dead Oceans. The album features a 21-piece orchestra recorded 200 feet below the earth in Lost World Caverns. It was preceded by two singles, "Party Anthem" and "Jesus and Your Living Room Floor".

Madison was listed as the 44th best album of 2021 by Gorilla vs. Bear.

Background
Haley Dahl first conceived of the album in 2017 and it took her two years touring over thirty caves to find the right acoustics for the project. It is a concept album revolving around "exploring fantasy relationships" Recorded in Lost World Caverns in West Virginia, the album was originally intended to be recorded on the Great Stalacpipe Organ, but Dahl could not receive permission to use it, so she recorded in a different cave. While the performers played in the cave, engineer Ryan Howe had to record the album in a car 90 feet above, since the humidity of the cavern would ruin the sound equipment. The entirety of the album was recorded over a two-week period in October 2019, with sessions lasting from 3 P.M. to dawn.

Track listing

Personnel
Credits taken from Discogs.

Musicians

Haley Dahl – vocals, bass, guitar, piano, conductor
Claudius Agrippa – violin
Sean Brennan – cello
Maria Caputo – additional conductor
Wesley Coleman – viola
Lily Desmond – violin
Lindsay Dobbs – trombone
Joshua Gerrard – viola
Jake Hardwick – trumpet
Odetta Hartman – violin
Huxley Kuhlmann – violin
Abby Lim-Kimmberg – harp
Kira McSpice – cello
Al Nardo – electric guitar, xylophone
Victor Pacek – tuba
Lily Rothman – flute
Joseph Sutkwoski – guitar
Von Kolk – flute
Jack Wetmore – bass, guitar
Bailey Wollowitz – drums, percussion, slide guitar
Choir:
Haley Dahl
Veronica Bianqui
Lily Desmond
Nicolette Miller
Al Nardo
Lily Rothman
Von Kolk
Bailey Wollowitz

Technical

Haley Dahl – producer
Sean Brennan – additional production, musical direction, score editor
Maria Caputo – piano tuner
Ryan Howe – engineer
Joel Jerome – engineer
Mika Lungulov-Klotz – producer
Al Nardo – producer
Ruben Radlauer – engineer
Lily Rothman – additional production
Hayden Ticehurst – assistant engineer
Jack Wetmore – producer, assistant engineer
Bailey Wollowitz – additional production

Artwork
Mika Lungulov-Klotz – Cover art and sleeve photo
Walter Wlodarczyk – sleeve photo

References 

2021 albums
Dead Oceans albums
Orchestral pop albums
Chamber pop albums
Concept albums